Działoszyce  is a town in Świętokrzyskie Voivodeship, Poland, with 2882 inhabitants as of December 2023.

History
The town is located in historic Lesser Poland, and the earliest mention of Działoszyce in historical records comes from 1220. In 1409 King Władysław II Jagiełło gave it a city charter (see Magdeburg rights). According to the 1921 census the town had a Jewish community consisting of 5618 people, or 83.6 percent of its total population.  The vast majority of the Jewish population was exterminated in the Holocaust by German Nazis during their occupation of Poland. After the war, Jewish survivors from Działoszyce submitted contributions to a Memorial Book (Yizkor Book). In subsequent years the town's population did not recover, and today it is less than one-fifth of what it was before the war.

Działoszyce, located on the Nidzica river (a tributary to the Vistula), was in the Middle Ages placed along a merchant route from Kraków to Wiślica. The settlement prospered due to the protection of bishop of Kraków Iwo Odrowąż, and King Kazimierz Wielki. In 1409, Działoszyce was granted Magdeburg rights by King Władysław Jagiełło. The town was part of Lesser Poland’s Sandomierz Voivodeship, and it belonged to the Ostrogski family, which collected tolls for crossing the river bridge. In the Polish–Lithuanian Commonwealth, Działoszyce was a local trade and craft center. In 1629 the town had 13 artisans and a mill. In 1662 it had 468 inhabitants and had the right to organize 12 fairs a year. In 1795, following the Partitions of Poland, Działoszyce was first annexed by Austria, and in 1807 it passed on to the Duchy of Warsaw (since 1815 - Russian-controlled Congress Poland). At that time, the number of Jewish settlers increased in the town which by 1820 had 1692 inhabitants, 74% of whom were Jews. 

In the Second Polish Republic, Działoszyce belonged to Kielce Voivodeship and in the 1920s and 1930s, the number of inhabitants decreased from 6755 (in 1920) to 5872 (1939). 

The town was occupied in September 1939 by the Germans.  About 7000 Jews lived in the town at the beginning of the war, a number that increased significantly as refugees fled from other places or were deported, to Dzialoszyce.  On arrival, the Germans began robbing and terrorizing the Jewish population.  They were crammed together in unsanitary conditions, often without running water.  For example, 1000 people were housed in the synagogue and adjoining hall.  In 1941, both typhoid and typhus epidemics spread throughout the community but a valiant Jewish doctor established processes of sanitation and disinfection. Some Jews were kidnapped and sent to forced labor camps.  In early September 1942, the Jews were rounded up.  The old and weak were taken to the cemetery in carts driven by Polish peasants under German orders.  At least 1200 were machine-gunned to death there.  Most of the rest were sent by train to Belzec where they were immediately gassed.  A few were sent to a labor camp. Several younger Jews fled to the forest and joined partisan groups fighting the Germans. By the end of the war, fewer than 200 survived.  Actions in Dzialoszyce were typical of the actions in other Polish towns as part of the Holocaust.

In 1946, the population of the town was 2506. Among points of interest, there are the parish church of the Holy Trinity (1222, frequently remodeled) and the ruins of a synagogue from 1852.

References

External links
 Official site of Działoszyce (in Polish)
 Jewish community of Działoszyce on Virtual Shtetl

Cities and towns in Świętokrzyskie Voivodeship
Pińczów County
Kraków Voivodeship (14th century – 1795)
Kielce Governorate
Kielce Voivodeship (1919–1939)
Holocaust locations in Poland